
Gmina Czastary is a rural gmina (administrative district) in Wieruszów County, Łódź Voivodeship, in central Poland.

Villages
Gmina Czastary contains the villages and settlements of Chorobel, Czastary, Dolina, Jaworek, Józefów, Kąty, Kniatowy, Krajanka, Krzyż, Nalepa, Parcice, Przywory, Radostów Drugi, Radostów Pierwszy and Stępna.

Neighbouring gminas
Gmina Czastary is bordered by the gminas of Biała, Bolesławiec, Łubnice, Sokolniki and Wieruszów.

References
Polish official population figures 2006

Czastary
Wieruszów County